The 1999–2000 Irish League Cup (known as the Coca-Cola League Cup for sponsorship reasons) was the 14th edition of Northern Ireland's secondary football knock-out cup competition. It concluded on 18 April 2000 with the final.

Linfield were the defending champions after their fifth League Cup win last season; a 2–1 victory over Glentoran in the previous final. This season they won a record third successive League Cup with a 4–0 victory over Coleraine in the final to lift the cup for the sixth time overall. The 4–0 scoreline remains the joint largest margin of victory in a League Cup final to date, with the record being equalled in 2013.

Linfield's record of winning three consecutive League Cups was equalled by Cliftonville's three consecutive wins in 2012–13, 2013–14 and 2014–15. It was then broken when Cliftonville added a fourth consecutive win in 2015–16.

Preliminary round

|}

First round

|}

Quarter-finals

|}

Replay

|}

Semi-finals

|}

Final

References

Lea
1999–2000 domestic association football cups
1999–2000